The Orissa famine of 1866 affected the east coast of India from Madras northwards, an area covering 180,000 miles and containing a population of 47,500,000; the impact of the famine, however, was greatest in the region of Orissa, now Odisha, which at that time was quite isolated from the rest of India. In Odisha, the total number who died as a result of the famine was at least a million, roughly one third of the population.

Causes
Like all Indian famines of the 19th century, the Orissa famine was preceded by a drought. The population of the region depended on the rice crop of the winter season for their sustenance. However, the monsoon of 1865 was poor and stopped earlier than expected.  In addition, the Bengal Board of Revenue made incorrect estimates of the number of people who would need help and was misled by fictitious price lists.  Consequently, as the food reserves began to dwindle, the gravity of the situation was not grasped until the end of May 1866, and by then the monsoons had set in.

Course and relief
Efforts to ship food to the isolated province were hampered by  bad weather, and when some shipments did reach the coast of Odisha, they could still not be moved inland. The British Indian government imported some 10,000 tons of rice, which reached the affected population only in September. Although many people died of starvation, more were killed by cholera before the monsoons and by malaria afterwards. In Odisha alone, at least 1 million people, a third of the population, died in 1866, and overall in the region approximately 4 to 5 million died in the two-year period.

The heavy rains of 1866 also caused floods which destroyed the rice-crop in low-lying regions. Consequently, in the following year, another shortfall was expected, and the Government of British India imported approximately 40,000 tons of rice at four times the usual price. However, this time they overestimated the need, and only half the rice was used by the time the summer monsoon of 1867. This was followed by a plentiful harvest and this marked ended the famine in 1868. In the two years of the famine, the Government of British India spent approximately Rs.9,500,000 on famine relief for 35 million units (i.e. one person per day); a large proportion of the cost, however, was the high price of the imported grain.

Effects of drought
Lessons learnt from this famine by the British rulers included "the importance of developing an adequate network of communications" and "the need to anticipate disaster". Indian Famine Codes were slowly developed which were "designed to be put into place as soon as a failure of the monsoon, or other warning-signal, indicated a probable shortage". One early success of this new approach was seen in the Bihar famine of 1873-74 when the famine relief under Sir Richard Temple resulted in the avoidance of almost all mortality.

The famine also served to awaken educated Indians about the effect that British rule was having on India. The fact that during the Orissa famine India exported more than 200 million pounds of rice to Great Britain even while more than one million succumbed to famine outraged Indian nationalists. Dadabhai Naoroji used this as evidence to develop the Drain Theory, the idea that Britain was enriching itself by "sucking the lifeblood out of India".

See also
Timeline of major famines in India during British rule (1765 to 1947)
Famines, Epidemics, and Public Health in the British Raj
Company rule in India
Famine in India
Drought in India

Notes

References

 

Famines in British India
Famines in India
1866 in India
19th century in Odisha
Disasters in Odisha
1866 disasters in India
19th-century famines